Sebastian Sylvester (born 9 July 1980) is a German former professional boxer who competed from 2002 to 2011 and held the IBF middleweight title from 2009 to 2011.

Professional career
In March 2007 Sylvester retained the WBA Inter-Continental Middleweight Title against Alessio Furlan at the Stadthalle, Rostock, Germany.

On 2 November 2008, Felix Sturm retained the WBA middleweight title via unanimous decision (118-110, 118-110 and 119-109) over Sylvester. He improved to 31-2-1, while Sylvester fell to 31–3.

He won the vacant IBF middleweight title by beating Giovanni Lorenzo on 19 September 2009 by split decision.

Professional boxing record

See also
List of middleweight boxing champions

References

External links 
 

1980 births
Living people
People from Greifswald
Middleweight boxers
World middleweight boxing champions
International Boxing Federation champions
German male boxers
Sportspeople from Mecklenburg-Western Pomerania